Pure Poverty is the second album by the American hip hop group Poor Righteous Teachers, released in 1991. "Shakiyla [JRH]" was released as a single.

Production
The album was produced by Tony D. "I'm Comin' Again" references the philosophy of Black Muslims.

Critical reception

The Washington Post wrote that "Tony D has put together some more muscular grooves, and Wise Intelligent swift-lips with authority, occasionally doing it dance hall style." Newsday deemed the album "Muslim rap at its best, with a strong reggae dancehall feel," and listed it as one of the best albums of 1991.

AllMusic noted that "if it weren't for the spare, airtight beats and the dexterous samples, their lyrics of cultural awareness, self-sufficiency and religious discipline would probably have fallen flat."

Track listing

Album chart positions

Singles chart positions

References

External links 

Poor Righteous Teachers albums
1991 albums
Profile Records albums